Walter Wenzel was a classical violinist from Milwaukee, Wisconsin. He studied at the Chicago College of Music under Petrowitsch Bissing and Herbert Butler.

References

American violinists
American male violinists
Year of birth missing
Year of death missing
Place of birth missing
Place of death missing
Musicians from Milwaukee
Roosevelt University alumni